Konstantinos Mitragas is a Greek businessman, sea captain and the secretary-general of the Hellenic Rescue Team that supports refugees arriving in Lesvos. He collected the Nansen Refugee Award in 2016 on behalf of the Hellenic Rescue Team.

Career 
Mitragas is a Thessaloniki-based business man, a sea captain, and the volunteer secretary-general of the Hellenic Rescue Team. Mitragas and his team support Syrian, Afghan, and Iraqi refugees arriving in at Lesvos, Greece.

In 2016, he collected the Nansen Refugee Award in on behalf of the team, as a result of their 2015 work during the European migrant crisis. The award was also shared with Efi Latsoudi of Pikpa camp.

Personal life 
Mitragas has two children.

References

External links 

 Official website - Hellenic Rescue Team
 Honouring Greek volunteers, Kate Bond, 5 September 2016 Norwegian Refugee Council

Year of birth missing (living people)
Living people
Sea captains
21st-century Greek people
European migrant crisis
Greek businesspeople
Businesspeople from Thessaloniki
Nansen Refugee Award laureates